Edward Hamlyn Adams (middle name also given as Hamlin (1777–1842) was a Jamaican-born British merchant.

Life
He was the son of William Adams of Barbados, born in Kingston, Jamaica on 30 April 1777. He was in business as a merchant in Kingston with Robert Robertson, involved in finding slave labour for the British administration.

In 1824 Adams purchased Middleton Hall. He served as High Sheriff of Carmarthenshire in 1831. He was Member of Parliament for Carmarthenshire in 1833–4.

Adams died on 30 May 1842.

Family
Adams married in 1796 Amelia Sophia MacPherson, daughter of Captain John MacPherson of Philadelphia. They had two sons. Edward, the elder son, took as surname a Welsh form, Ab-Adam (from Ap Adam, see Welsh patronym) or Abadam; he married Louisa Taylor.

There were three daughters of the marriage of Edward the elder and Amelia. They included Matilda Adams (1815–1896), who was the mother of Eugene Lee-Hamilton, by her first husband James Lee-Hamilton (died 1852), and Vernon Lee (real name Violet Paget), by her second husband Henry Ferguson Paget.

Edward Abadam (1809–1875) quarrelled with his brother William (1814–1851). He had four daughters, the youngest being Alice Abadam, who became a leader in the suffragist and feminist movement. He left Middleton Hall to the eldest, Lucy (1840–1902), who married the Rev. Richard Gwynne Lawrence (1835–1923). It then passed to her sister Adah (1842–1914), and to her son William John Hamlin Hughes, who sold the estate in 1919.

Notes

1777 births
1842 deaths
British merchants
Members of the Parliament of the United Kingdom for Welsh constituencies
UK MPs 1832–1835
British slave owners